N. K. Anand is a  Regents Professor and the holder of  James J. Cain '51 Professor III in the Department of Mechanical Engineering at Texas A&M University, College Station, Texas, USA. He was the Executive Associate Dean for the College of Engineering at Texas A&M University from 2009 to 2022 and the Associate Director of Texas A&M Engineering Experiment Station from 2007 to 2022. In February 2022, Professor Anand was appointed as the Vice President for Faculty Affairs at Texas A&M University.

Research Work
N. K. Anand's research focuses on the development and application of computational techniques to study fluid flow and heat transfer. Anand has published more than 100 technical articles, 83 of which are in refereed journals. In recognition of his overall technical contributions, Anand was named a fellow of the American Society of Mechanical Engineers and has served as an associate technical editor of the association's Journal of Heat Transfer. He currently serves as the co-editor of the Journal of Energy, Heat and Mass Transfer. In addition, he is a member of the editorial board for Numerical Heat Transfer and is currently chair of the association's K-20 Committee on Computational Heat Transfer. Dr. Anand is also the co-author of the graduate level textbook titled "Finite Element and Finite Volume Methods for Heat Transfer and Fluid Dynamics".

Education
 PhD. - Mechanical Engineering, Purdue University 1983
 M.S. - Mechanical Engineering, Kansas State University 1979
 B.E. - Mechanical Engineering, Bangalore University, India 1978

Awards

 2020 ASME James Harry Potter Gold Medal.
 The Association of Former Students Texas A&M University, University Level Faculty Distinguished Achievement Award for Administration, 2018
 Regents Professor, Texas A&M University System, November 2014
 Inducted to Kansas State University Engineering Hall of Fame, Manhattan, Kansas, March 2011
 Outstanding Graduate Teaching Award, March 2009, The Department of Mechanical Engineering, Texas A&M University
 Distinguished Alumni presented by the B. M. S. American Alumni Association, B. M. S. College of Engineering, Bangalore, India, December 2008
 James and Ada Forsyth Professorship, 2007
 Charles W. Crawford Service Award, 2006
 The Association of Former Students Texas A&M University Faculty Distinguished Achievement in Teaching Award, 2001

References

External links 
 

Living people
American people of Indian descent
Texas A&M University faculty
Year of birth missing (living people)